Teach: Tony Danza is an American reality show about actor Tony Danza becoming a tenth-grade English teacher at Northeast High School in Philadelphia, Pennsylvania, during the 2009–2010 school year. The show premiered October 1, 2010 on A&E. Filming took place predominantly during the first semester of the school year, with a few unaired scenes shot at the end of the second semester. Production was halted at the end of the first semester after the producers felt that existing footage was not dramatic enough, and after Danza refused to allow the producers to try to generate drama among his students. The existing footage was used to create the seven episodes that aired.
Tony continued to teach his class until the end of the school year and returned for a few years after the show aired as a commencement speaker at graduation.

Historical Significance
In a survey of public opinion around New Jersey, Teach: Tony Danza was voted the most important show of the 2000s

Episode list

References

External links

2010 American television series debuts
2010 American television series endings
A&E (TV network) original programming
English-language television shows
2010s American reality television series
2010s American high school television series
Television series about educators
Television shows set in Philadelphia